Taste My Steel! is a role-playing game published by Phantasy Network in 1982.

Description
Taste My Steel! is a historical system of the swashbuckling era. The game includes rules for swordplay and swordsmanship, firearms, brawling, and creating scenarios and campaigns.

Publication history
Taste My Steel! was designed by Don Johnson, and published by Phantasy Network in 1982 as a 56-page book.

Reception

References

Historical role-playing games
Historical Swashbuckler role-playing games
Role-playing games introduced in 1982